Mohamed El-Sayed may refer to:

 Mohamed El-Sayed (Qatari footballer) (born 1987), Qatari footballer
 Mohamed El-Sayed (athlete) (1905–?), Egyptian middle-distance runner
 Mohamed El-Sayed (Egyptian footballer), Egyptian footballer
 Mohamed El-Sayed (field hockey) (born 1981), Egyptian Olympic hockey player
 Mohamed El-Sayed (rower) (born 1924), Egyptian rower
 Mohamed El-Sayed (fencer) (born 2003), Egyptian fencer
 Mohamed Hafez El-Sayed (born 1963), Egyptian Olympic weightlifter
 Mohamed Elsayed (born 1973), Egyptian boxer